Michelbach an der Bilz is a town in the district of Schwäbisch Hall in Baden-Württemberg in Germany.

References

Schwäbisch Hall (district)